Raposeira is a village and former civil parish in the municipality of Vila do Bispo, District of Faro, in Algarve region, Portugal. It is told that it is named after fox because raposa means fox in Portuguese. In 2013, the parish merged into the new parish Vila do Bispo e Raposeira. It has an area of 25.71 km² and 441 inhabitants (2001).

It is one of the parishes covered by the Southwest Alentejo and Vicentine Coast Natural Park.

Raposeira was one of the places where the 15th-century Portuguese prince Henry the Navigator set up residence during his lifetime. Henry was known to have attended mass at the isolated but spacious chapel dedicated to the cult of Our Lady of Guadalupe, believed to have been originally erected by the Templar knights in the latter part the 13th century, and one of the few Medieval structures in this region of the Algarve to have survived the 1755 earthquake intact.

There are several groups of megalithic menhirs on the way to beach. It has been a very friendly place to stay for nomad groups, surfers and many had done retirement settlement here. People from Germany, England, Holland and more of Europe enjoy happy days here. The place is windy in summer because of the beach nearby. Wind blows mostly from two sides and it is really interesting because when the wind blows from Monchique a nearby area popular for medroneah (a very strong local alcoholic drink) it feels cold but on the other side is Morocco from where the very hot wind blows.
There are not many choices to eat like in the centre of Raposeira but there are local Portuguese bars and small cafe restaurant. There is a pizza restaurant called Pizza Point which normally opens after 3:00 pm.

The village is very calm with kind-hearted people.

Bus transport is available from 6:00 in the morning to 8:00 in the evening sometimes differing on public holidays. But it is always better with your own means of transportation because if you want to travel to Sagres and Lagos from there you have to meet the bus timetable.

Patrimony 

 Menhir of Aspradantes
 Hermitage of Our Lady of Guadalupe
 Igreja da Raposeira
 Casa do Infante
 Battery of Zavial

References

Former parishes of Vila do Bispo